"Freakin' Out" and "All Over Me" are songs by Graham Coxon that appeared on his 2004 album Happiness in Magazines. They were released as the final single from the album as a double A-side in October 2004 (see 2004 in British music). The single peaked at number 19 on the UK Singles Chart.

Track listings
Promo CD CDRDJ6652
"Freakin' Out" - 3:42
"All Over Me" - 4:16
7" R6652
"Freakin' Out" - 3:42
"All Over Me" - 4:16
CD CDR6652
"Freakin' Out" - 3:42
"All Over Me" - 4:16
Maxi-CD CDRS6652
"Freakin' Out" - 3:42
"All Over Me" - 4:16
"Singing In the Morning" - 3:39
"Freakin' Out" (video)

External links
Official Graham Coxon website (contains link to streaming audio of the song)
contactmusic.com single review

2004 singles
Graham Coxon songs
Song recordings produced by Stephen Street